Ain El Delb (عين الدلب) is a small village in the Sidon District of the South Governorate in Lebanon.

History
In 1875 Victor Guérin found the village to be inhabited by Maronites.

References

Bibliography

External links
 Official web page
Ain Ed Delb, Localiban 

Populated places in Sidon District
Maronite Christian communities in Lebanon